Uril is a rural locality (a selo) and the administrative center of Urilsky Selsoviet of Arkharinsky District, Amur Oblast, Russia. The population was 90 in 2018. There are five streets.

Geography 
Rachi is the nearest rural locality.

References 

Rural localities in Arkharinsky District